Henry Augustus Philip Muhlenberg (May 13, 1782 – August 11, 1844) was an American political leader and diplomat.  He was a member of the Muhlenberg family political dynasty.

Early life
Henry Augustus Philip Muhlenberg was born in Lancaster, Pennsylvania on May 13, 1782.  Henry was the son of Mary Catherine (née Hall) Muhlenberg and Gotthilf Henry Ernest Muhlenberg, a prominent clergyman and botanist.

His paternal grandfather was Henry Muhlenberg, a German born Lutheran pastor who was sent to North America as a missionary. His paternal grandmother, Anna Maria (née Weiser) Muhlenberg was the daughter of Colonial leader, Conrad Weiser.  Among Henry's uncles were Revolutionary War leaders, Frederick Muhlenberg, later the 1st Speaker of the U.S. House of Representatives, and Peter Muhlenberg, who served as the 8th Vice-President of Pennsylvania under Benjamin Franklin before his election as a U.S. Representative and U.S. Senator from Pennsylvania.

Career
Henry studied theology and was ordained a Lutheran minister in 1802.  He served as pastor of Trinity Lutheran Church in Reading, Pennsylvania from April 1803 to June 1829.

He was elected a member of the American Antiquarian Society in 1814.

Political career
In 1828, Muhlenberg was elected to the United States House of Representatives to serve in the 21st United States Congress as a Jacksonian Democrat.  He was reelected, as a Jacksonian, to the 22nd through 24th United States Congresses.  On December 9, 1834, he wrote to John M. Read, later the Attorney General of Pennsylvania, about James Buchanan's election to the United States Senate, stating: "I rejoice in the election of our friend Buchanan" and that "he will be an honor to the State and of much service to our friends."

Muhlenberg was again reelected to the 25th Congress, this time as a Democrat, and served from March 4, 1829, until his resignation on February 9, 1838 when he was appointed the first United States Minister to the Austrian Empire on February 8, 1838.  He presented his credentials in Vienna on November 7, 1838, and served until September 18, 1840 when he left his post and was succeeded by Daniel Jenifer.

He ran unsuccessfully for Governor of Pennsylvania twice in 1835 and 1838.  He was nominated by the Democratic Party a third time in 1844, but died before the election took place.

Personal life
Muhlenberg was twice married. His first marriage was in 1805 to Mary Elizabeth Muhlenberg (1784–1806).  Mary died on March 21, 1806 giving birth to a daughter:

 Mary Elizabeth Muhlenberg (1806–1838), who married the Rev. Ehrgott Jonathan Deininger (1801–1881).

After her death, he remarried to Rebecca Hiester (1781–1841) on June 7, 1808.  Rebecca was the daughter of Elizabeth (née Witman) Hiester and Joseph Hiester, the 5th governor of Pennsylvania. Together, they were the parents of:

 Emma Elizabeth Muhlenberg, who died in infancy.
 Hiester Henry Muhlenberg (1812–1886), who married Amelia Howard (1817–1852). After her death, he married Katharine Spang Hunter (1835–1913).
 Emma Elizabeth Muhlenberg (1817–1833), who died unmarried.
 Rosa Catharine Muhlenberg (1821–1867), who married Gustavus Anthony Nicolls (1817–1886).
 Henry Augustus Muhlenberg (1823–1854), who was elected to Congress and married his cousin, Ann Hall Muhlenberg.

Muhlenberg died in Reading, Pennsylvania on August 11, 1844 and is interred at the Charles Evans Cemetery.

Descendants
Through his son Henry, he was the grandfather of Henry Augustus Muhlenberg III, who unsuccessfully ran for Congress in 1892.

References

External links

 
 

1782 births
1844 deaths
Ambassadors of the United States to Austria
American Lutherans
American people of German descent
Burials at Charles Evans Cemetery
Muhlenberg family
Politicians from Lancaster, Pennsylvania
19th-century American diplomats
Jacksonian members of the United States House of Representatives from Pennsylvania
Democratic Party members of the United States House of Representatives from Pennsylvania
Members of the American Antiquarian Society
19th-century American politicians